Shen He (born 7 May 1981), better known by his stage name Xiaoshenyang, is a Chinese actor. He was a student of Zhao Benshan and was an errenzhuan performer before joining the film and television industry.

Xiaoshenyang became famous immediately in China after the 2009 CCTV New Year's Gala, where he stole the thunder from Zhao playing an effeminate restaurant waiter in a skit.  He also showed off his considerable vocal prowess. He continued to attend the CCTV New Year's Gala during the following three years, and now attends New Year's Gala in Beijing TV and Liaoning TV.

He changed his name to "Xiaoshenyang" to show his sincerity for his wife—the name was based on his wife's name, "Shen Chunyang". "Yang" means sun, therefore, his fans are the "Yangguang" ("Sunshine").

Xiaoshenyang has acted in Zhao Benshan's television series Rural Love 2 and Rural Love Stories and in Zhang Yimou's A Simple Noodle Story.

Filmography
2018, Airpocalypse
2018, The Monkey King 3
2018-12-29, Mad Ebriety（The Morning Afte）()
2018-06-15, The Way of the Bug
2016-12-30, Some Like It Hot
2016-02-08, The Monkey King 2
2016-02-01, The New Year's Eve of Old Lee 
2015-12-31, Detective Chinatown
2015-12-04, Impossible
2015-07-17, Jian Bing Man (guest star)
2015-03-05 The Right Mistake
2014,Houseful of Elders (unaired)
2014-08-08, TV series Harvest Season(guest star)
2014-02-28, TV series War Veteran
2014-02-03, TV series Rural Love Waltz(guest star)
2012, TV series Time to Love (unaired)
2013-09-15, TV series Who's the True Hero
2013-07-11, TV series One Who Tell Tales
2013-03-02, TV series As The Cherry Turns Red
2013-01-08, The Grandmaster(guest star)
2013-01-07, TV series Rural Love Partita (guest star)
2012-10-16, TV series The Cook Kitchen
2012-10-15, TV series It's Not the Problem With Money
2012-08-17, The Lion Roars 2
2012-02-19, TV series Cherry(guest star)
2012-02-12, TV series The Warring State's Soldier
2012-01-27, TV series Rural Love Serenade (guest star)
2012-01-16, TV series Strange Paladin OuYangDe
2011-05-05, TV series Rural Love Symphony (guest star)
2011-01-27, TV series All Who Come Are Welcomed
2010-12-03, Just Call Me Nobody
2010-02-16, TV series Rural Love III (guest star)
2009-12-10, A Simple Noodle Story
2009-01-30, TV series Mr.Guandong (guest star)
2008-02-10, TV series Rural Love II (guest star)

Television programs
2008-08-01/2008-08-02, A Date With Luyu
2008, Joyful Assembly
2008, Super Competition
2009-02-14, Superstars Get Involved
2009-02-18,2009-02-09, Real Stories
2009-03-16/03-17/03-18/03-19, Yird
2009-04-03, The Same Song
2009-07-25, Superstars Get Involved
2009-10-11, Joyous China
2009-10-16, The Same Song
2009-11-21, Star Boulevard
2009-12-03, Real Stories
2009-12-10, Five Star Talk
2009-12-14/12-15/12-16/12-17, Love Film
2009-12-20, Kefan's Hearken
2009-12-21/12-22/12-23/12-24/12-25/12-26, Benshan Happy Camp
2009-12-24, Dance  Assembly
2009-12-27, Chenchen All Stars
2010-01-02, Superstars Get Involved()
2010-01-03, Kevin Listens
2010-02-01, Proud of China
2010-02-28, Happiness Lasts
2010-03-13, Superstars Get Involved
2010-03-21, Joyous China
2010-04-03, Superstars Get Involved
2010-04-24, Variety Big Brother
2010-04-30, Kangxi Lai Le
2010-05-05, Super Ace
2010-05-07, Kangxi Lai Le
2010-05-07, The Chinese Passion
2010-09-16, We Have Our Way
2010-09-21, Benshan Happy Camp
2010-11-26, Benshan Happy Camp
2010-11-27, Star Boulevard
2010-11-27, Benshan Happy Camp
2010-11-27, Happy Camp
2010-12-04, Superstars Get Involved()
2011-02-13, Comedy World()
2011-02-15, Xiao Cui Talk Show
2012-02-13, Superstar Is Coming
2012-02-04, Happy Camp
2012-02-05, Star Boulevard
2012-03-01, Take A Risk
2012-03-03, Happy Camp
2012-03-08, Take A Risk
2012-08-15, Close Meeting
2012-10-12, Legend of Songs
2013-02-11, Good Show
2013-06-21, Copycat Singers
2013-07-29, Super Talk Show
2013-08-02, To Be In Rural Love VII()
2013-09-06, Bigstar
2013-09-07, Duets
2013-09-25, Film Flow
2013-09-28, Close Meeting
2013-12-18/12-19, Who Will Benshan Choose
2014-01-08/01-09, Who Will Benshan Choose
2014-01-11~2014-03-29, The First Time with Shen Chunyang and Shen Jiarun
2014-01-27/02-17/02-24, Door to Fortune
2014-02-25, The Real Is Not False
2014-05-17~2014-08-02, Mad For Music
2014-06-09, Laugh Out Loud
2014-08-08, Beijing Shows
2014-10-09, Laugh With Celebs
2015-04-25/05-02/05-30, Joyful Comedians
2015-06-18, 尖叫吧路人

References

1981 births
Male actors from Liaoning
People from Tieling
Living people
Singers from Liaoning
Chinese male film actors
Chinese male television actors
21st-century Chinese male singers